Diogo José Teixeira da Silva (born 4 December 1996), known as Diogo Jota, is a Portuguese professional footballer who plays as a forward or a winger for Premier League club Liverpool and the Portugal national team.

Jota started his career with Paços de Ferreira, before signing for La Liga club Atlético Madrid in 2016. After two seasons in the Primeira Liga, he was consecutively loaned to Primeira Liga club FC Porto in 2016 and English EFL Championship club Wolverhampton Wanderers in 2017. Having helped them gain promotion to the Premier League, he joined the club in 2018 for a reported €14 million and went on to make 131 appearances for them, scoring 44 goals. In 2020, he signed for Liverpool for a fee reported to be £41 million.

Jota is a former Portugal youth international, representing his country at under-19, under-21 and under-23 levels. He was included in the squad for the 2019 UEFA Nations League Finals, which Portugal won on home soil, and made his senior international debut in November 2019, playing at UEFA Euro 2020.

Club career

Paços de Ferreira
Born in Porto, Jota joined Paços de Ferreira's youth setup in 2013, from Gondomar. He was promoted to the main squad at the start of the 2014–15 season, and made his senior debut on 19 October 2014 by starting in a 4–0 home win against Atlético de Reguengos for the Taça de Portugal.

Jota first appeared in the Primeira Liga on 20 February 2015, coming on as a late substitute for Diogo Rosado in a 2–2 home draw against Vitória de Guimarães. He scored his first goals in the competition on 17 May, netting a brace in a 3–2 home success over Académica de Coimbra and becoming the youngest player to score for the club in the top tier in the process.

On 30 May 2015, Jota signed a new five-year deal with Paços, keeping him tied up until 2020. In the first game of the campaign, a 1–0 win over Académica at the Estádio da Mata Real on 17 August, he was sent off at the end for pushing Hugo Seco; Ricardo Nascimento was also sent off for retaliating on his teammate's behalf.

Atlético Madrid
On 14 March 2016, Jota agreed a five-year contract with Atlético Madrid effective as of 1 July. On 26 August 2016, however, he returned to his homeland and joined FC Porto on a one-year loan. On 1 October, Jota scored a first-half hat-trick in a 4–0 away victory against Nacional. Jota also took part in the 2016–17 UEFA Champions League, scoring his first goal in the competition on 7 December in a 5–0 home victory against Leicester City.

Wolverhampton Wanderers

2017–19: Premier League promotion and Europa League finish

On 25 July 2017, Jota moved to English Championship club Wolverhampton Wanderers on a season-long loan. He scored his first goal on 15 August, in a 3–2 away win over Hull City.

On 30 January 2018, it was announced that a permanent deal with Jota had been agreed for a reported €14 million, being made effective on 1 July. He scored a career-best 17 league goals in his first year, ranking fifth in the league top scorer charts, as Wolves achieved promotion to the Premier League as champions; due to English Football League regulations, he wore his legal surname on his jersey in the Championship but was able to change it to "Diogo J" after the feat.

Jota made his debut in the Premier League on 11 August 2018, playing the full 90 minutes in a 2–2 home draw against Everton. He scored his first goal in the competition on 5 December, helping the hosts come from behind to beat Chelsea 2–1. His second came four days later, in a win at Newcastle United by the same scoreline.

On 19 January 2019, Jota netted three times in the 4–3 home victory over Leicester City – his second career hat-trick. In the process, he became only the second Portuguese player to achieve the feat in the Premier League after Cristiano Ronaldo 11 years earlier. This was a first-ever for the club in the competition and a first for the club in the top flight of English football since John Richards, against the same opposition, in the Football League First Division in October 1977. On 16 March 2019, Jota scored a goal in a 2–1 win against Manchester United in the 2018–19 FA Cup, to help Wolves reach their first semi-final in the competition since 1997–98.

2019–20: Final season with Wolves
On 25 July 2019, Jota scored in a 2–0 win over Northern Irish club Crusaders in the Europa League second qualifying round, Wolves' first European goal since October 1980, and in the next round on 15 August, he scored an overhead kick to conclude a 4–0 (8–0 aggregate) victory over Pyunik.

In the final Europa League group stage game at home to Beşiktaş on 12 December 2019, Jota replaced compatriot Rúben Neves as a 56th-minute substitute with the game goalless, scored after 72 seconds and completed a hat-trick within twelve minutes as Wolves ran out 4–0 victors. The following 20 February, he netted another treble in a win by the same score over Espanyol in the first leg of the last 32 of the tournament. His 131st and last appearance for Wolves was as a second-half substitute in their Europa League quarter-final against Sevilla on 11 August 2020; his 44th and final goal for the club in a 3–0 league victory over Everton on 12 July.

Liverpool

2020–21: Debut season and adaptation
On 19 September 2020, Jota joined Liverpool on a long-term deal, reportedly for a £41 million transfer fee, rising to £45 million with potential add-ons. He made his debut in the EFL Cup five days later, coming on as a second-half substitute against Lincoln City in a 7–2 win. On 28 September, he scored on his Premier League debut for the club, with the third in a 3–1 win against Arsenal at Anfield. On 25 October, he scored the winning goal in a 2–1 win against Sheffield United at Anfield. Three days later, Jota scored the club's 10,000th goal in their history when he netted the opener against FC Midtjylland in the UEFA Champions League group stage, and scored a hat-trick on 3 November in a 5–0 win at Atalanta in the Champions League in the same competition on 3 November. In doing so, he became the first player since Robbie Fowler in 1993 to score 7 goals in his first 10 Liverpool appearances. On 22 November, Jota scored the second goal in a 3–0 victory against Leicester City, becoming the first Liverpool player to score in each of his first four home matches in the Premier League. For his performances in October, Jota was awarded Liverpool Player of the Month by the club's supporters. On 9 December, Jota suffered a leg injury during a UEFA Champions League match against Midtjylland, in a dead rubber match, sidelining him for three months.

Jota ended his debut season at the club with nine league goals, including a back heel in a 4–2 away win against Manchester United, which helped Liverpool finish third in the Premier League and qualify for the Champions League.

2021–22: Cup double and European final

On 14 August 2021, Jota scored Liverpool's first goal of the 2021–22 Premier League season in a 3–0 away victory against newly promoted Norwich City. On 24 October, he scored in a 5–0 away victory against Liverpool's arch rivals Manchester United at Old Trafford. On 3 November, he opened the scoring in a 2–0 home victory in the Champions League against his former club Atlético Madrid to ensure Liverpool's qualification to the round of sixteen, as group winners. On 20 November, Jota scored in a 4–0 home win against Arsenal, followed by a brace against Southampton a week later in a game of the same score. On 1 December, he scored Liverpool's fourth goal in a 4–1 away win against local rivals Everton in the Merseyside derby, as the club became the first team in English top-flight history to score at least two goals in eighteen successive games in all competitions. For his performances in November, he was awarded PFA Fans' Player of the Month. On 16 December, Jota scored Liverpool's first goal in a 3–1 home win against Newcastle United, in what was Liverpool's 2,000th top-flight win.

On 20 January 2022, in the second leg of the league cup semi-finals, Jota scored both goals in a 2–0 away win over Arsenal to send Liverpool into the final. On 27 February, following a goalless draw against Chelsea after extra time, he scored his penalty to help Liverpool win their first league cup since 2012.

On 14 May 2022, in the 2022 FA Cup Final, Jota came on as a substitute for the injured Mohamed Salah after 33 minutes. Liverpool won the final after a penalty shoot-out, in which Jota scored his penalty.

2022–23: Contract extension
Jota suffered a hamstring injury in the pre-season which made him miss the start of the season. On 2 August 2022, Jota signed a new long-term deal with the club. He made his return from injury on 3 September, replacing Darwin Núñez in the 80th minute of a 0–0 draw against rivals Everton in the Merseyside derby. On 12 October, Jota came off the bench in a Champions League match away to Rangers, before providing three assists in one match for the first time in his career to Mohamed Salah, who completed a hat-trick in the space of six minutes and twelve seconds of an eventual 7–1 win. On 16 October, he suffered a calf injury during Liverpool's 1–0 home win over Manchester City, which ruled him out for the 2022 FIFA World Cup. He returned from injury on 13 February, replacing Darwin Núñez in the 70th minute in a 2–0 victory against Everton.

International career

Youth
Jota started playing for Portugal at under-19 level, scoring his first goal on 29 May 2015 in a 6–1 home win over Turkey in 2015 UEFA European Under-19 Championship qualification. He won his first cap for the under-21 team on 17 November of the same year at not yet 19, playing 15 minutes in the 3–0 away defeat of Israel in another qualifier. On 25 May 2018, he netted a brace for the under-21s in their 3–2 friendly win over Italy held in Estoril.

Senior
In March 2019, Jota was called up to the senior side for the first time, ahead of the opening UEFA Euro 2020 qualifying matches against Ukraine and Serbia. Still uncapped, he was part of the squad that won the 2019 UEFA Nations League Finals on home soil in June but did not make an appearance. On 14 November, he made his debut by coming on as an 84th-minute substitute for Cristiano Ronaldo in a 6–0 win against Lithuania in a UEFA Euro 2020 qualifier. He scored his first international goal on 5 September 2020 in a 4–1 home win over Croatia in the UEFA Nations League.

Jota was named in Portugal's final squad for the delayed UEFA Euro 2020 tournament, scoring in a 4–2 group stage defeat to Germany. He played all games in a round of 16-exit defeat to Belgium.

On 18 October 2022, Jota was ruled out of the 2022 FIFA World Cup due to a calf injury he sustained during a league match with Liverpool against Manchester City on 16 October 2022. His timeline for recovery is unknown, although Jürgen Klopp, manager of Liverpool, stated he will not require surgery.

Personal life
Jota is an avid gamer, and as of 6 February 2021, was ranked world No. 1 in FIFA 21's Champions Leaderboard. He has his own eSports team known as "Diogo Jota eSports" and regularly streams on Twitch. During the lockdown during the COVID-19 pandemic he took part in an invitational series of FIFA matches, run by the Premier League, eventually beating future teammate Trent Alexander-Arnold in the final of the competition.

Jota and his wife Rute Cardoso have a son born in 2021.

Career statistics

Club

International

Scores and results list Portugal's goal tally first, score column indicates score after each Jota goal

Honours
Wolverhampton Wanderers
EFL Championship: 2017–18

Liverpool
FA Cup: 2021–22
EFL Cup: 2021–22
UEFA Champions League runner-up: 2021–22

Portugal
UEFA Nations League: 2018–19

Individual
SJPF Young Player of the Month: October/November 2015 
Primeira Liga Goal of the Month: February 2016
UEFA Champions League Breakthrough XI: 2020

Notes

References
International appearances

General

External links

Diogo Jota at the Liverpool F.C. website

1996 births
Living people
Footballers from Porto
Portuguese footballers
Association football forwards
F.C. Paços de Ferreira players
FC Porto players
Atlético Madrid footballers
Wolverhampton Wanderers F.C. players
Liverpool F.C. players
Primeira Liga players
English Football League players
Premier League players
FA Cup Final players
Portugal youth international footballers
Portugal under-21 international footballers
Portugal international footballers
UEFA Euro 2020 players
UEFA Nations League-winning players
Portuguese expatriate footballers
Expatriate footballers in England
Expatriate footballers in Spain
Portuguese expatriate sportspeople in England
Portuguese expatriate sportspeople in Spain